BC-STV is the proposed voting system recommended by the Citizens' Assembly on Electoral Reform in October 2004 for use in British Columbia, and belongs to the single transferable vote family of voting systems. BC-STV was supported by a majority (57.7 percent) of the voters in a referendum held in 2005 but the government had legislated that it would not be bound by any vote lower than 60 percent in favour.  Because of the strong majority support for BC-STV, the government elected to stage a second referendum in 2009, but with increased public funding for information campaigns to better inform the electorate about the differences between the existing and proposed systems. The leadership of both the "yes" side and the "no" side were assigned by the government. The proposal was rejected with 60.9 percent voting against, vs. 39.1 percent in favour, in the 2009 vote.

Background
In 2003, the Liberal government of Premier Gordon Campbell, with the agreement of the opposition New Democratic Party, established a Citizens' Assembly on Electoral Reform, mandating it to propose a new electoral system, which would subsequently be put to referendum. The assembly designed and recommended a system that it named BC-STV (British Columbia Single Transferable Vote), as described in the Assembly's Final Report. A referendum was held on that recommendation in conjunction with the 2005 BC election.

Law preventing promotion of referendum 
The law governing STV advertising changed after the 2005 referendum. Although it was included as a referendum on the May 12, 2009, ballot, STV promotion was banned from election advertising.

The BC Electoral Reform Referendum 2009 Act Regulation Section.29.4 reads:
Referendum advertising must not, directly or indirectly, (a) promote or oppose a registered political party or the election of a candidate, or (b) form part of election advertising. Section.1 definition – "referendum campaign period" means, in relation to the referendum, the period beginning on February 1, 2009 and ending at the close of general voting for the referendum.

First referendum

The referendum was presented as a Yes/No question, with a Yes vote leading to adoption of BC-STV, and a No vote leading to retention of the existing single-member plurality system. However, the government also legislated that the referendum results would not be binding unless a supermajority of 60 percent of the voters voted the same way (and also formed a simple majority in at least 60 percent (48 of 79) of British Columbia's electoral districts).

While a simple majority of voters in 97 percent of the electoral districts (77 of 79) voted to support the adoption of the BC-STV system, in the province-wide popular vote 57.69 percent of the population voted to support BC-STV, falling 2.3 percent short of the government-set requirement for the result to be binding.

Consequently, the results of the referendum were not binding on the government, and the government did not take any steps to adopt the BC-STV system. However, a decision was taken to hold a second referendum, given how close the results were.

Second referendum

A second referendum on electoral reform was held in conjunction with the provincial election on 12 May 2009.  The BC-STV electoral system was again voted on by the British Columbia electorate. To be binding, similar to 2005, the referendum required 60 per cent overall approval and 50 per cent approval in at least 60 per cent of the province's electoral districts. Partially addressing concerns expressed during and after the first referendum campaign, voters were able to consult a map of proposed electoral boundaries under the BC-STV system, and advocacy groups were given some public funding to campaign for and against the new electoral system.

The province's voters defeated the change with only 39.09 percent voting in favour.

System design

Summary of system mechanics
Since Confederation with Canada in 1871, British Columbia had a system of primarily single-member electoral districts with some multi-member districts, with each voter casting as many votes as there were open seats on an unranked ballot. This voting method was used except for during two elections in the 1950s, when BC adopted instant run-off voting. The 17 multi-member ridings were eliminated in 1988.

Unlike the fully single-member system in place since 1988, STV groups all legislative seats regionally into multiple-member electoral districts. This is done so that seats in the region can be allocated in a way that reflects the distribution of votes among the electorate. For example, Richmond and Delta's five existing constituencies would be combined into one electoral district which would produce five winners, proportional to the votes in the multi-member district. It is very unlikely that all would be from the same party, in contrast to the situation in the 1996 election, when all five of these seats were won by the same political party.

Political parties may nominate as many candidates in an electoral district as there are available seats, although experience with STV elsewhere (and all elections in general) suggests that not all will do so. For instance, in Ireland where five or more parties run candidates, a five-seat district would typically have about 10 or 15 candidates. Major parties will typically nominate more candidates in a district than will minor parties, as they will be hopeful of electing a larger number of MLAs.

The most important feature of the system is that, although each voter has only one vote, their single vote may be apportioned and used to elect multiple candidates based on the voter's ranked preferences (if any). To this end, the voter is invited to rank-order candidates, although they are not required to do so. The candidates will be grouped by political party in separate columns on the ballot paper, as is the practice in the Australian state of Tasmania. However, voters would be allowed to express preferences for candidates of different parties if they chose to do so.

A quota for the district is determined based on the number of valid ballots cast and the number of seats available in the district. All the votes are counted and sorted by the voters' first preferences. Those candidates with enough first-preference votes to meet or exceed the quota are elected. A multiple-step vote counting and transfer process is then used to determine the winners of the remaining seats in the district by taking voters' secondary preferences into account.

Although the processing of secondary votes can be complicated, the Assembly expresses the general principle was explained in the following simplified way in the Assembly's Final Report as follows: "If a voter's favourite candidate (#1) is not elected, or has more votes than are needed to be elected, then the voter's vote is "moved" to his or her next most favourite candidate (#2). The vote is transferred rather than wasted. The aim of this system is to make all votes count" (Final Report, p. 6).

Proposed electoral district boundaries

Under the first past the post or FPTP system, British Columbians elected members from 79 one-member districts in 2005, but this expanded to 85 for the 2009 election. Boundaries commissions, appointed after alternate elections, use census data to maintain a nominally uniform population level across districts (within court-mandated bounds) so that voters have approximately equal representation. Currently, districts have a mean population of about 50,000.  However, there can be considerable discrepancies between electoral districts, because districts are permitted to be as small as 75 percent or as large as 125 percent of the provincial average, and even these bounds may be exceeded in special circumstances. Moreover, population migrations between redistrictings can lead to further drift away from uniformity. Vancouver-Burrard has the largest population at about 67,000 people and North Coast has the smallest population at about 27,000 people.

One of the criticisms of this method of is that in many populous communities, in order to create districts with a population of approximately 50,000, it may be necessary to draw arbitrary boundaries which do not necessarily reflect a community of interest.

The Electoral Boundaries Commission which reported in 2008 was charged with drawing up new boundaries for both the single-member system and the proposed new BC-STV system. Under BC-STV, much larger districts would be created that will elect multiple members. Proponents argue that this creates districts with a stronger sense of community and common interest, in which voters will have several MLAs and can get service or representation from any of them. For example, the 11 new single-member constituencies within the municipality of Vancouver would be combined under STV to form two electoral districts, one West, one East. The five electoral districts within Richmond and Delta will  be combined to form one electoral district. Each STV district is formed by amalgamating a collection of single-member constituencies; therefore the total number of MLAs per region, and the population per MLA within each region, is independent of the choice of system.

Foreign comparisons

The proposed BC-STV system was chosen by the members of the Citizens' Assembly to best suit B.C. However, it has specific similarities to and distinctions from STV electoral systems currently being used in other countries:
Unlike in elections to the Australian Senate and similar to elections in Ireland, Northern Ireland, voters will not be required to rank every candidate; the purpose of this provision is to avoid forcing voters to rank candidates they either do not know or do not support.
If votes are transferred because a candidate has exceeded the quota and been deemed elected, all of that candidate's ballots are examined for transfer votes using the Gregory method that is used for elections in Northern Ireland and to the Irish Senate (sometimes referred to as "Senatorial rules"). This is different from the Hare method used for Ireland's lower house, the Dáil, whereby after a candidate has reached the quota (after the first count) only the last parcel of votes transferred to that candidate is examined for further preferences. 
In the case of a vacancy, a by-election is held using the BC-STV system. In a riding with a single vacancy, this is equivalent to the alternative vote system. This is similar to the Irish system, but differs from the system used in Malta and Tasmania, where the original ballots are recounted with the departing members' votes transferred to their next preferences.

See also
 2005 British Columbia electoral reform referendum
 2009 British Columbia electoral reform referendum
 Citizens' Assembly on Electoral Reform (British Columbia)
 Single transferable vote
 Fair Vote Canada

References

Bibliography
Review of STV systems used in Australia, Ireland, Northern Ireland, Estonia, Malta and the Isle of Man
Ireland: The Archetypal STV System
Irish Proportional Representation System

External links
Citizens' Assembly on Electoral Reform (archived)
Riding map prepared by Elections BC 
STV.ca - the main advocacy site run by Fair Voting BC
knowstv.ca - the main opposition site
Elections BC
CBC BC Votes 2005
Vern Faulkner 'Even democracy needs an upgrade now and then'
Simulations
DemoChoice STV Simulation - online virtual election with real candidates
Poll comparing the STV to the FPTP system

2005 in British Columbia
Politics of British Columbia
Referendums in British Columbia
Single transferable vote
Electoral reform in Canada